Computadoras, Redes e Ingeniería, S.A. (CRISA) is a Spanish leading company in space Flight Electronics design and production. Established in 1985, Crisa has been working since its inception in the area of space qualified electronics with the successful participation in more than 400 space missions. 

Crisa has played a relevant role in most ESA's scientific and Earth observation missions, developing payload processors and hardware and software controllers: data processing units, control units, power conditioning and distribution units. Other activities within the space segment include avionics for satellites, launchers and space vehicles and Ground Segment both in civil and Defence applications.

In 2000, CRISA became part of the Airbus group and now is fully integrated into Airbus Defence and Space

CRISA is based in Tres Cantos, near Madrid and employs over 450 qualified workers.

External links
 CRISA website

Manufacturing companies of Spain
Companies based in the Community of Madrid